Robert J. (Bobby) Levin (born November 19, 1957) is an American professional bridge player, from Aventura, Florida. He was the youngest winner of the Bermuda Bowl world championship for national teams from 1981 until 2015, when 19-year old Michal Klukowski of Poland succeeded him. Levin is also a five-time winner of the Cavendish Invitational Pairs, the world's leading contest for cash prizes, with his regular partner Steve Weinstein.  As of June 2013, Levin ranks number 20 among Open World Grand Masters and his wife Jill ranks number 21 among Women World Grand Masters.

Levin–Weinstein were one-third of USA1 in the 2011 Bermuda Bowl, where they finished fourth. Beginning mid-2012 they joined Nick Nickell's team. The professional teams hired by Nickell had won four of the preceding nine biennial Bermuda Bowls, from 1995.

Career 
Levin was born in Southampton, Long Island, New York. As a 13-year-old, he won the first tournament event he ever entered – the Men's Pairs at a New York sectional – making him the youngest winner in the history of the event.

When Levin was 15, the family moved to Miami. In March 1973, he became the youngest life master in the history of the American Contract Bridge League (ACBL) at the age of 15 years and 4 months, a record since broken. Once in Miami, Levin met two players – Billy Seamon and Russell Arnold – who had a profound influence on his bridge career. By the age of 17, Levin was playing professionally on teams with Arnold, sponsored by Bud Reinhold.

In 1979, his team (Reinhold, Arnold, Jeff Meckstroth and Eric Rodwell) tied for first in the Reisinger Board-a-Match Teams. Because the Reisinger was a qualifying event for the playoff to determine North America's representative in the world championship (ACBL team trials), a playoff between the Reisinger winners was necessary; they lost to the Dallas Aces comprising Ira Rubin, Fred Hamilton, Bob Hamman and Bobby Wolff.

Next spring the Reinhold team won the Vanderbilt Knockout Teams in Fresno, California, qualifying for the team trials. The squad easily won the right later that year to represent the United States in the 1981 Bermuda Bowl in Port Chester, New York. The team added John Solodar and defeated Zia Mahmood-led Pakistan for the championship. The win made Levin, at 23 years old, the youngest world champion at the time, a distinction he held for 34 years, until 19 year old Michal Klukowski's win with the 2015 champion Polish team.

About a year later, Levin moved to Chicago to work as an options trader. When the market crashed in 1987, Levin was back to Florida, entering the real estate business with one of his brothers. He moved to the Orlando area in 1988 and lived there for twelve years.

His regular partner is Steve Weinstein, who is also a world class poker player. When forming their partnership, they spent a week with Marty Bergen in Florida to put together their system.

Levin and his wife since January 1998, Jill, who is also a world champion bridge player, reside in Lake Ariel, Pennsylvania (as of 2010).

Bobby's son Andrew is a college student and Jill's sons Shane and Justin Blanchard are "upcoming bridge players" (as of 2010).

Bridge accomplishments

Awards
 ACBL Player of the Year, 2014
 Herman Trophy 1979
 ACBL King of Bridge 1975

Wins
 Bermuda Bowl (1) 1981
 World Open Pairs Championship (1) 2010
 North American Bridge Championships (33)
 Vanderbilt (6) 1980, 1989, 2009, 2011, 2014, 2017
 Spingold (1) 1992
 Reisinger (1) 1979, 2021
 Grand National Teams (3) 1997, 1999, 2000
 Open Board-a-Match Teams (2) 1996, 2006
 Men's Board-a-Match Teams (1) 1987
 Jacoby Open Swiss Teams (2) 2005, 2006
 Master Mixed Teams (1) 1987
 Blue Ribbon Pairs (2) 1979, 2018
 Life Master Pairs (3) 1989, 1994, 2001
 Life Master Open Pairs (1) 1994
 Life Master Men's Pairs (1) 1988
 Open Pairs (2) 1978, 2015
 Open Pairs II (1) 1993
 IMP Pairs (1) 2003
 Fast Open Pairs (1) 2007
 Roth Open Swiss Teams (1) 2010
 Norman Kay Platinum Pairs (2) 2014, 2018
 United States Bridge Championships (5)
 Open Team Trials (5) 1980, 1993, 2010, 2014, 2017
 European Open Bridge Championships (1)
 Mixed Teams (1) 2003
 Other notable wins:
 Buffett Cup (2) 2006, 2010
 Cavendish Invitational Teams (3) 1999, 2005, 2008
 Pan American Open Teams (1) 1992
 Sunday Times–Macallan Invitational Pairs (1) 1993
 Cavendish Invitational Pairs (5) 1999, 2002, 2007, 2009, 2010

Runners-up

 World Transnational Open Teams (1) 2000
 World Open Pairs (1) 2006
 World Mixed Pairs (1) 2006
 North American Bridge Championships (29)
 Vanderbilt (5) 1984, 2000, 2010, 2018, 2019
 Spingold (3) 1988, 1991, 2012
 Grand National Teams (3) 1978, 1992, 2007
 Open Board-a-Match Teams (3) 1990, 2012, 2013
 Men's Board-a-Match Teams (1) 1983
 Open Swiss Teams (2) 2008, 2018
 Blue Ribbon Pairs (4) 1987, 1988, 2000, 2004
 Life Master Open Pairs (2) 2005, 2013
 Open Pairs II (1) 1999
 Men's Pairs (1) 1986
 Senior Knockout Teams (2) 2017, 2018
 Jacoby Open Swiss Teams (1) 2016
 Reisinger (1) 2014
 United States Bridge Championships (2)
 Open Team Trials (2) 2000, 2017
 Other notable 2nd places:
 Cavendish Invitational Teams (3) 2000, 2006, 2009
 Cap Gemini World Top Invitational Pairs (1) 2000
 Macallan Invitational Pairs (1) 1994
 Cavendish Invitational Pairs (1) 1994

Notes

References

"The natural: Bobby Levin now at a high point in his life". NABC Orlando 98 Daily Bulletin 10:7. ACBL. Reprinted at Clairebridge (Claire Martel). Retrieved 2011-05-21.

External links
 Bobby Levin profile at Bridge Winners (maintained by Levin)
 
 Audio-video interview uploaded October 27, 2009, by ACBLvideo at YouTube
 Robert Levin ACBL Database NABC Wins

1957 births
American contract bridge players
Bermuda Bowl players
Living people
People from Suffolk County, New York
People from Aventura, Florida